Matt Butcher may refer to:
 Matt Butcher (musician)
 Matt Butcher (footballer)

See also
 Matthew Butcher, Western Australia Police constable